Jean Mohsen Fahmy (born 1942) is an Egyptian Canadian writer. He is most noted for his 2005 novel L'Agonie des dieux, which was the winner of the Trillium Book Award for French fiction in 2006, and his 2019 novel La sultane dévoilée, which was the winner of the Christine-Dumitriu-Van-Saanen from the Salon du livre de Toronto in 2019.

He was a shortlisted Trillium finalist on two other occasions, for Amina et le mamelouk blanc in 1999 and for Frères ennemis in 2010.

Works

Fiction

Non-fiction 
 Voltaire et l’amitié (1972)
 Études Rousseau Trent (1980)
 Jean-Jacques Rousseau et la société du XVIII siècle (1981)
 Voltaire et Paris (1981)
 Chrétiens d'Orient, le courage et la foi (2015)

References

1942 births
Living people
20th-century Canadian novelists
20th-century Canadian non-fiction writers
20th-century Canadian short story writers
20th-century Canadian male writers
21st-century Canadian novelists
21st-century Canadian non-fiction writers
21st-century Canadian short story writers
21st-century Canadian male writers
Canadian male novelists
Canadian male non-fiction writers
Canadian male short story writers
Canadian novelists in French
Canadian non-fiction writers in French
Canadian short story writers in French
Egyptian emigrants to Canada
Franco-Ontarian people
Writers from Ottawa